is a Japanese association football referee who currently officiates in the J-League, and Div. 2. Since 2007 he has been an international referee.

Career
Since becoming a professional referee in 2008, Minoru has been refereeing in the J-League and Div. 2. He has also officiated  the 2008 AFC President's Cup group stage game between Dordoi-Dynamo Naryn and Nagacorp FC. He has refereed in the 2008 AFC Cup, officiating 3 matches. He has also covered in the 2009 AFC Champions League officiating 3 games, likewise in the 2010 AFC Champions League. He also, as a guest referee, officiated the final game of the Polish Ekstraklasa between Legia Warsaw and Lech Poznan.

International matches

To date, Minoru has officiated four full internationals, as well as being a referee in the 2008 AFC U-16 Championship. He has also refereed three friendlies, and a 2011 Asian Cup qualification game.

He refereed the FIFA World Cup 2014 Third Round Qualifier match between Singapore and Iraq on 6 September 2011, making a controversial decision where he denied Singapore a blatant penalty.

He was the referee for the Southeast Asian Games final match between Malaysia and Indonesia on 21 November 2011 and was widely praised for his calm refereeing of the match between the two great rivals.

See also
 List of football referees

References

External links
 WorldReferee profile
 Football-Lineups profile

1976 births
Japanese football referees
Living people
Association football people from Saitama Prefecture
People from Tokorozawa, Saitama